E. darwini may refer to:

Enochrus darwini
Erechthias darwini
Eremaeozetes darwini
Eupistella darwini

See also
 E. darwinii (disambiguation)
 Darwini (disambiguation)